Juju is the third album by Japanese singer Juju, released on March 17, 2010.

Track listing

Disc one

 GIRLS NEVER GIVE UP
Words by JUJU
Music by SKY BEATZ & Takuya Harada 
Arranged by SKY BEATZ

 
Words by Kiyoshi Matsuo. Music by Jin Nakamura

 Ashita Ga Kurunara 明日がくるなら / JUJU with Jay'ed
Words by JUJU, Jay'ed, Jeff Miyahara
Music by JUJU, Jay'ed, Jeff Miyahara, RYLL & couco
Arranged by Jeff Miyahara & RYLL

  round & round
Words by JUJU 
Music by DJ HIROnyc & JUJU 
Produced and Arranged by DJ HIROnyc
Bass and Guitar by Takahiro Sokusai
Piano by Junya Yamaguchi

  37℃
Words by BONNIE PINK 
Music by Joleen Belle, Joachim Svare, Carsten Lindberg Hansen & Charlene Carmon  
Produced and Arranged by Great Dane
 
  Itsukaraka Zutto いつからか...ずっと
Words by PESRIP SLYME 
Music by HALEFANIE 
Arranged by Seiji Kameda

  Sobaniite そばにいて
Words by Ami 
Music by Ayumi Miyazaki 
Arranged by Shinichiro Murayama

  I never knew 〜もしも時間がもどせるなら〜
Words by JUJU
Music and Arranged by Mats Lie Skare (Warner/Chapell Music Scandinavia)

  S.H.E.
Words by Mai Osanai
Music by SOAR
Arranged by URU
 
  Ga-bera no Hana ガーベラの花
Words and Music by Daisuke Kawagchi
Arranged by CHOKKAKU
 
  READY FOR LOVE
Words and Music by JUJU & Jeff Miyahara
Arranged by Jeff Miyahara, Pochi
 
  Hontouha ほんとうは feat.MONCH(Ramwire)
Words by JUJU & MONCH(RamWire)
Music by Joleen Belle, Joachim Svare, Carsten Lindberg Hansen & Robyn Johnson
Arranged by Great Dane
 
  bouquet
Words and Music by Kiyosaku Uezu (MONGOL800)
Arranged by Masato Ishinari

 Yorunohate 夜の果て
Words by JUJU 
Music and Arranged by E-3

  Take Me Higher
Words by JUJU 
Music by Youji Noi
Arranged by Alec Shantzis

  PRESENT
Words by usewax (RamWire) 
Music by RYLL (RamWire) & usewax (RamWire) 
Arranged by RYLL

Disc 2

LET’S WAIT AWHILE
YEARNING FOR YOUR LOVE
奇跡を望むなら... -English version-
There Must Be An Angel (Playing With My Heart)
I like it 
New York State Of Mind 
Something About Us 
THE POWER OF LOVE 
LAST CHRISTMAS 
DON’T KNOW WHY 
NEVER STOP 
Saving All My Love For You  
Street Life 
The Rose 
Ex-Factor

Accolades
The album won The Excellence Album Award at the 52nd Japan Record Awards.

Chart positions

2nd Oricon Weekly Album Chart (the first week of April 2010)
32nd Oricon Top 100 Album first half of the year (2010)
62nd Oricon Top 100 Album of the Year (2010)
The Album kept staying on Oricon Album Chart 54 times
1st USEN Request Chart (March 25, 2010)

Certification

Certified as Gold Disk by RIAJ (March 10, 2010)

References 

2010 albums
J-pop albums
Juju (singer) albums
Onenation albums